Affair with a Stranger is a 1953 American comedy-drama directed by Roy Rowland and starring Jean Simmons and Victor Mature. It was originally to be released as Kiss and Run.

The film centres on the rumoured marital troubles of a successful playwright. As various people who came into contact with the couple reminisce about the couple's past, the story of the relationship and the budding affair that is potentially destroying it is told through a series of flashbacks.

Upon release, the film was met with lukewarm reviews, Bosley Crowther of The New York Times calling it "a virtual collection of cliches".

Plot
On a train, playwright Bill Blakeley (Victor Mature) fends off the romantic flirtations of Janet Boothe (Monica Lewis), an actress from his play. But, when wife Carolyn (Jean Simmons) decides not to join him, Bill makes a dinner date with Janet, who plants a story with a gossip columnist about the Blakeleys possibly heading for a divorce.

Friends and acquaintances begin recalling how the couple met. Carolyn Parker was a fashion model who bought a Toledo, Ohio, newspaper each day. Bill pretended to be from Toledo as well to get to know her, only to learn that Carolyn's actually from England and has been buying the papers for a neighbor.

After their marriage, Bill's struggles to find work, combined with his gambling, force Carolyn to support them. He finally takes a job as a waiter and slips a copy of a manuscript to a customer, a producer who makes Bill's play a success.

One night, Carolyn must miss the opening of a play because she is having a baby. The child dies, and she can have no more. Bill is as supportive in her hour of need as she had been in his.

Concerned that he might be vulnerable to an ambitious actress, however,  Carolyn takes the next train to New York. She runs into Bill at the station and into his arms. They both deny leaking the information. Bill realizes the trains are leaving and talks to the station master. Meanwhile Carolyn looks at the hanky  she used to wipe her tears. It has lipstick on it. As Bill returns to tell her there are no more rains and they will have to find a hotel, she drops the hanky into the garbage.

Cast
 Victor Mature as Bill Blakeley
 Jean Simmons as Carolyn Parker
 Monica Lewis as Janet Boothe
 Jane Darwell as Ma Stanton
 Linda Douglas as Dolly Murray
 Dabbs Greer as Happy Murray
 Wally Vernon as Joe, Taxi Driver
 Nicholas Joy as Producer George W. Craig
 Olive Carey as Cynthia Craig
 Victoria Horne as Mrs. Wallace
 Lillian Bronson as Miss Crutcher
 George Cleveland as Pop
 Billy Chapin as Timmy

Production
Victor Mature was going to star in Split Second. However he assigned to this instead and production on Split Second was pushed back. Filming started 9 July 1952 and papers reported it being "rushed before the cameras".

The original title was Break up. This was changed to Kiss and Run in April 1953 before becoming Affair with a Stranger.

The film was the fourth Jean Simmons made for Howard Hughes and RKO. Simmons and her husband Stewart Granger sued Hughes to get out of the contract. It settled out of court. Part of the final arrangement was she would do this film for no extra money. Also, Simmons agreed to make three more movies under the auspices of RKO, but not actually at that studio – she would be loaned out. She would make an additional picture for 20th Century Fox while RKO got the services of Victor Mature for one film. (Simmons and Mature would team two other times, on Fox's enormously popular The Robe and in The Egyptian)

Olive Carey, widow of Harry Carey, had a small role. Steve Rowland, son of director Roy Rowland, made his debut in the film.

Reception
The Los Angeles Times called the story "quite ordinary" and said the film "can't seem to make up its mind if it's comedy or drama."

References

External links
 
 
 
 
 Review of film at The New York Times
 Affair with a Stranger at Victormature.net

1953 films
1953 comedy-drama films
American comedy-drama films
American black-and-white films
Films scored by Roy Webb
Films about writers
Films directed by Roy Rowland
RKO Pictures films
1950s English-language films
1950s American films
English-language comedy-drama films